Akhund Mahalleh (also Romanized as Ākhūnd Maḩalleh) is a village in Divshal Rural District, in the Central District of Langarud County, Gilan Province, Iran. At the 2006 census, its population was 101, in 32 families.

References 

Populated places in Langarud County